Jemm is a fictional alien character appearing in various comic book series published by DC Comics. He is an analogue of and occasional ally of Martian Manhunter.

Publication history
Created by Greg Potter and Gene Colan, Jemm first appeared in Jemm, Son of Saturn #1 (September 1984).

The first unofficial appearance of a Red Saturnian in DC Comics was Detective Comics #314 (April 1963) where he was a nameless alien criminal who was weakened by motor oil, enabling the Martian Manhunter to defeat him.

According to Greg Potter, co-creator of Jemm, the character was originally conceived as the cousin of the Martian Manhunter (Jogar, Jemm's cousin in the series, was originally the Manhunter). This was at a time when the Manhunter had disappeared from the pages of DC Comics for a time. However, part-way through developing the series, Potter was told by editor Janice Race that she had learned Manhunter would reappear in the Justice League of America. To avoid any continuity problems, Potter rewrote the series as Jemm, Son of Saturn, a character with no connection to the Martian Manhunter.

Jemm was reintroduced to the DC Universe by Grant Morrison in JLA #12, which emphasized his similarity to J'onzz. During his run on Martian Manhunter, John Ostrander used these similarities to explain that the Saturnians were a race created by and modelled on the Martians.

Fictional character biography

H'ronmeerca'andra
The three races of Ma'aleca'andra (the Martian name for the planet Mars in the DCU) are directly responsible for the H'ronmeerca's (Saturnians). The Saturnians are genetically modified descendants from the underclass Martian worker clones created by their ancient Martian explorers as they ran Martian colonies on Saturn's moons. The Martians cloned the original Saturnians from themselves; the Red Saturnians were created by the Green Martians while the White Saturnians were created by the White Martians. Both races of clones were created and bred to survive and live on the planet Saturn. The Green Martians treated their clones as equals while the White Martians treated their clones as slaves. The fate of the Yellow Martians is unknown during this time period.

The continued enslavement of the White Saturnians started a civil war between the two Martian races. At the war's conclusion the White Martians were exiled to the "Still Zone", only to escape years later and reappear disguised as the Hyperclan. After the civil war all Saturnians were granted their freedom, but continued to war amongst themselves for millennia.

Jemm, son of King Jaxx was forced to flee the palace after a White Martian coup. His mother Jarlla was able to hide him in a cave, where Jemm was trained by his White Saturnian teacher Rahani in the use of his powers.

Earth 
After both his mother and teacher were killed by the White Martians, Jemm stole a ship and escaped to Earth, in search of his lover Syraa who had fled there earlier. He arrives in Harlem, New York and is befriended by an African-American orphan named Luther Mannkin. After a series of adventures with and without Luther, Jemm eventually found Syrra. They all then travelled to "New Bhok", a Red Saturnian colony. Because he refused to take sides in a civil war on New Bhok, Jemm was disavowed and cast out by both factions. Dispirited Jemm and Luther returned to Earth.

There Jemm learned that a criminal named Claudius Tull planned to use Saturnians as living energy sources. He had allied himself with a female White Saturnian named Synn. When Tull's true goal was exposed, Synn surrendered her forces to the Red Saturnian military. When last seen, Jemm had set out in search of Syrra, who had mysteriously disappeared yet again.

Injustice Gang
Jemm resurfaced years later as a member of the Injustice Gang. He had apparently been brainwashed by Lex Luthor through the use of a Philosopher's Stone and used as a psychic weapon against the Justice League. He was able to impersonate J'onn J'onnz telepathically. Plastic Man, disguised as the Joker, played several pranks designed to awaken him, but failed. J'onnz was able to sense and connect with Jemm's mind. J'onn powers freed Jemm, but left him comatose.

J'onn took Jemm to Z'onn Z'orr, his hidden Antarctic retreat to heal his mind. Jemm spent the next several months recovering his mental and physical health. He was later discovered, detained and abused by J'onn's evil brother Malefic, who convinced the JLA that J'onn had gone insane and was torturing Jemm.

While Jemm recovered at the JLA Watchtower, a delegation of Saturnians arrived to reclaim the prince. J'onn discovered that Jemm was to take part in a brokered political wedding designed to unite warring factions of Red and White Saturnians.

Rings of Saturn
During the trip to H'ronmeerca'andra, J'onn learned more about Jemm's future bride, a White Saturnian named Princess Cha'rissa. Cha'rissa became romantically attracted to J'onn, and he admitted his own attraction to her. The trio uncovered a plot by Jemm's White Saturnian cousin Jogarr to assassinate him, and Cha'rissa vowed to put aside her feelings for J'onn and be true to her intended, Prince Jemm. J'onn left for Earth just before the wedding ceremony.

Rann/Thanagar War
Though Jemm seems a pacifist, he joined forces with the Rannians in their war against Thanagar.

New Krypton
Jemm appears in Superman: World of New Krypton #9 (November 2009), and now appears to command all three known Saturnian races including the albino "Koolars", and the yellow skinned "Faceless Hunters".

When Mon-El brings the bottled city of the Lanothians to Titan, Jemm does not agree to allow the race of stronger telepaths live near his people. He later changes his mind when the Lanothians agree to live under his rule and rename themselves the Titanians.

Powers and abilities
 Jemm is superstrong, and has the power of flight. He is also a telepath, and possesses the ability to fire psychokinetic energy discharges from the organic gemstone in his forehead. The gemstone is known as the Mark of Jargon. Jargon the Mighty is alleged to have brokered peace between the red and white races.
 Unlike Green Martians, Red Saturnians like Jemm cannot shapeshift, but they are capable of rapid cellular regeneration. Koolars, a subset of the White Saturnians, are indeed capable of shapeshifting like Martians. Koolars have also demonstrated the power to meld with inanimate matter.
 Like Martians, all Saturnians are psychologically vulnerable to fire.

Other versions
 In DC's new Multiverse, on Earth-48, J'emm exists as a political leader from Saturn. In this alternate history, the 9 planets of the Solar System settle all armed disputes on Earth (renamed War World). When the Forerunners revolted, the Martian and Saturnian armies were slaughtered. J'emm was the only survivor of this conflict.
 Fura, a Saturnian warlord from 3000 A.D., appeared in Batman #26, an enemy of the Batman of 3000 AD.
 Jemm appears in Scooby-Doo Team Up comics.

In other media

Television
 A variation of Jemm appears in the Supergirl episode "Human for a Day", portrayed by Charles Halford. This version is an alien criminal, escapee from the Phantom Zone maximum security prison Fort Rozz, and leader of the Faceless Hunters. When an earthquake hits National City, Jemm escapes the Department of Extranormal Operations (DEO)'s custody before he is killed by Martian Manhunter.
 A variation of Jemm appears in Young Justice: Phantoms, voiced by Phil LaMarr. This version is a Red Martian prince named J'emm J'axx. He befriends Superboy and entrusts him, Miss Martian, and Beast Boy with finding his father's murderer while trying to bring peace between all Martians due to escalating racial issues. He also happily supports Superboy and Miss Martian's marriage. He is saddened to learn the murderer was S'yraa S'mitt, a Martian he was previously engaged to, but is forced to break off their relationship after discovering S'yraa accidentally killed his father when her magic grew out of control in her efforts to seek his father's approval. J'emm later takes charge, inspiring the Martians to bring change and equality, and mourns Superboy's apparent sacrifice. He is later sought out by Phantom Girl, who reveals Superboy is still alive and is trapped in the Phantom Zone before working with Miss Martian and the Justice League to rescue him. By the end of the series, he attends Miss Martian and Superboy's wedding ceremony on Earth.

Miscellaneous
Jemm received an action figure in wave 15 of Mattel's "DC Universe Classics" line in 2010.

References

External links
 Cosmic Teams: Jemm, Son of Saturn
 DCU Guide: Martian Manhunter Vol. 2 #13
 DCU Guide: Martian Manhunter Vol. 2 #14
 DCU Guide: Martian Manhunter Vol. 2 #15
 DCU Guide: Martian Manhunter Vol. 2 #16
 DCU Guide: Jemm chronology
 DC Universe Who's Who: Jemm
 Heroesanddragons.com: Grant Morrison Writes … (Part 2) Jemm

DC Comics titles
DC Comics aliens
DC Comics characters who can move at superhuman speeds
DC Comics characters with accelerated healing
DC Comics characters with superhuman senses
DC Comics characters with superhuman strength
DC Comics extraterrestrial superheroes
DC Comics extraterrestrial supervillains
DC Comics male supervillains
DC Comics male superheroes
DC Comics characters who have mental powers
DC Comics telekinetics 
DC Comics telepaths
Comics characters introduced in 1984
1984 comics debuts
Characters created by Gene Colan
Fictional characters with immortality 
Fictional characters who can turn intangible